Pocket Money is a 1972 American Western buddy comedy film directed by Stuart Rosenberg, from a screenplay written by Terrence Malick and based on the 1970 novel Jim Kane by J.P.S. Brown. The film stars Paul Newman and Lee Marvin and takes place in 1970s Arizona and northern Mexico.

It was filmed mostly in the small town of Ajo, Arizona. Portions of the film were shot at Southwestern Studios in Carefree, Arizona, a facility originally built by cast member Fred Graham.

According to co-star Wayne Rogers, in an episode of Pop Goes the Culture, Newman and Marvin did not get along especially well during production. This was one of three films that Newman, Rogers, and Rosenberg made together; the others being Cool Hand Luke (1967) and WUSA (1970).

The song "Pocket Money" is composed and performed by Carole King.

Plot
Broke and in debt, an otherwise honest cowboy known as Jim Kane (Newman) gets mixed up in some shady dealings with Stretch Russell (Rogers) and Bill Garrett (Martin), a crooked rancher. Russell tells Kane to escort 200 head of cattle from Mexico to the United States for a good sum of money. Kane agrees and brings along his friend Leonard (Marvin) to aid him. Unfortunately, the two come upon many unexpected events that often deter them from completing their job.

Cast
 Paul Newman as Jim Kane
 Lee Marvin as Leonard
 Strother Martin as Bill Garrett
 Wayne Rogers as Stretch Russell
 Hector Elizondo as Juan
 Christine Belford as Adelita
 Kelly Jean Peters as Sharon (Kane's ex-wife)
 Gregg Sierra as Guerro Chavarin
 Fred Graham as Uncle Herb
 Matt Clark as American prisoner
 Claudio Miranda as Manisterio Publico
 Terrence Malick as Worksman

Reception
Roger Ebert of the Chicago Sun-Times gave the film two stars out of four and wrote, "The movie seems to be going for a highly mannered, elliptical, enigmatic style, and it gets there. We don't." Gene Siskel of the Chicago Tribune gave the film zero stars out of four and called the performances by the two leads "completely self-indulgent," suggesting that "Maybe Newman and Marvin made it because they wanted to go slumming in Mexico for two weeks. On that basis, 'Pocket Money' can be considered a 35-millimeter home movie of what Paul Newman and Lee Marvin did last summer." Vincent Canby of The New York Times called it "a fragmented, far-from-great movie, and it won't change cinema history, but in its own odd fashion it celebrates humdrum lives without ever resorting to patronizing artifice." Kevin Thomas of the Los Angeles Times wrote that Newman and Marvin had "found precisely the right material to enable them not only to play off each other but also to shine individually. This delightful contemporary comedy-western in fact is that most precious of commodities these days: a movie that actually cheers you up and leaves you feeling better when you come out than when you went in."

TV Guide wrote in a retrospective review, “Paul Newman, Sidney Poitier, Barbra Streisand, Steve McQueen, and Dustin Hoffman formed First Artists, and this was their premier offering. It wasn't as terrible a movie as the first reviews of it indicated, but since so much was expected, anything less than brilliance was a letdown.”  On Rotten Tomatoes the film has a 50% rating based on reviews from 8 critics.

References

External links
 
 
 

1972 films
1970s buddy films
1970s Western (genre) comedy films
American buddy films
American Western (genre) comedy films
1970s English-language films
Films directed by Stuart Rosenberg
Films produced by John Foreman (producer)
Films scored by Alex North
Films set in Arizona
Films set in Mexico
Films shot in Arizona
Films shot in New Mexico
First Artists films
Neo-Western films
1972 comedy films
1970s American films